James Watts (15 December 1835 – 15 December 1919) was an English first-class cricketer active 1855–60 who played for Kent. He was born in Hythe; died in Bromley.

References

1835 births
1919 deaths
English cricketers
Kent cricketers
Gentlemen of Kent and Sussex cricketers
Gentlemen of Kent cricketers